Fausto Abeso Fuma is an Equatoguinean diplomat and is the current Ambassador of Equatorial Guinea to Russia, presenting his credentials to Russian President Vladimir Putin on 20 April 2005.

References

Living people
Ambassadors of Equatorial Guinea to Russia
Ambassadors of Equatorial Guinea to Ukraine
Year of birth missing (living people)